Flaminia Jandolo (February 11, 1930 – May 22, 2019) was an Italian actress and voice actress.

Biography
Daughter of writer Rina De Felici, Jandolo began her career in the early 1950s in Rai's radio prose, before addressing to voice acting and dubbing. Among the several actresses she dubbed, there are Brigitte Bardot, Jean Simmons, Joan Plowright, Joanne Woodward, Maggie Smith and Debbie Reynolds.

Jandolo was also very active in dubbing many animated characters, including Lady in Lady and the Tramp, the fairy Merryweather in Sleeping Beauty, Perdita in One Hundred and One Dalmatians and Mrs. Brisby in The Secret of NIMH.

Personal life
Jandolo was married to dialogue adapter Alberto Piferi, from whom she divorced and from whom she had her children Leonardo and Susanna, who were also dialogue adapters, and Caterina, who is a dubbing assistant.

Dubbing roles

Animation
Lady in Lady and the Tramp 
Fairy Merryweather in Sleeping Beauty
Perdita in One Hundred and One Dalmatians
Cindy Bear in Hey There, It's Yogi Bear!
Anastasia Tremaine in Cinderella (1967 redub)
Mrs. Rabbit in Bambi (1968 redub)
Mrs. Brisby in The Secret of NIMH
Granny in Bugs Bunny's 3rd Movie: 1001 Rabbit Tales
Filo Fester in Alakazam the Great

Live action
Lucie in The Grand Maneuver
Agnès Dumont in Plucking the Daisy
Juliette Hardy in And God Created Woman
Ursula in The Night Heaven Fell
Éva Marchand in The Female
Babette in Babette Goes to War
Sophie in Please, Not Now!
Marie Fitzgerald O'Malley in Viva Maria!
Giuseppina in Spirits of the Dead
Miriam Polar in Valley of the Dolls
Fritzie Braddock in Buona Sera, Mrs. Campbell
Minnie Littlejohn in The Long, Hot Summer
Claudia Procula in The Greatest Story Ever Told
Miss Humphries in The Third Secret
Sally Young in A Study in Terror
Ellen Brody in Jaws
Ellen Brody in Jaws 2
Joyce in The Night Walker
Kathy Selden in Singin' in the Rain
Em Reed in How to Make an American Quilt
Dorothy Kingship in A Kiss Before Dying
Mary-Lou in The Man Who Fell to Earth
Miss Bowers in Death on the Nile
Jean Rice in The Entertainer
Gwendolyn Pigeon in The Odd Couple
Henrietta Lowell in A New Leaf
Patricia Hingle in Suspiria
Lil Mainwaring in Marnie
Josefa in Sugar Colt
Stella Baines in Back to the Future
Jolanda in Stato interessante
Di Giovanni Marisa in Torture Me But Kill Me with Kisses
Prostitute in Il prato macchiato di rosso

References

External links
 
 

1930 births
2019 deaths
Actresses from Rome
Italian voice actresses
Italian film actresses
Italian television actresses
Italian voice directors
20th-century Italian actresses